This article serves as an index – as complete as possible – of all the honorific orders or similar decorations awarded by Finland, classified by Monarchies chapter and Republics chapter, and, under each chapter, recipients' countries and the detailed list of recipients.

Awards

Monarchies 
European monarchies

British Royal Family 

 The Queen :  1961 - Collar of the Order of the White Rose
 The Prince of Wales : 1969 – - Grand Cross of the Order of the White Rose (SVR SR)
 The Princess Royal : 1969: Grand Cross of the Order of the White Rose of Finland (SVR SR)

Norwegian Royal Family 
See also decorations pages (mark °) : Harald, Sonja, Haakon, Mette-Marit, Mârtha Louise, Astrid & Ragnhild

 Harald V of Norway: Grand Cross with Collar of the Order of the White Rose of Finland° 
 Queen Sonja of Norway: Grand Cross of the Order of the White Rose of Finland° 
 Haakon, Crown Prince of Norway: Grand Cross of the Order of the White Rose of Finland° 
 Mette-Marit, Crown Princess of Norway: Grand Cross of the Order of the White Rose of Finland (2012)° 
 Princess Märtha Louise of Norway: Commander Grand Cross of the Order of the White Rose of Finland°
 Princess Astrid of Norway: Commander Grand Cross of the Order of the White Rose of Finland°

Swedish Royal Family   

 Carl XVI Gustaf of Sweden : Grand Cross with Collar of the Order of the White Rose
 Queen Silvia of Sweden : Grand Cross with Collar of the Order of the White Rose 
 Victoria, Crown Princess of Sweden : Grand Cross of the Order of the White Rose (1996)
 Prince Daniel, Duke of Västergötland : Grand Cross of the Order of the White Rose of Finland (17 April 2012)
 Prince Carl Philip, Duke of Värmland : Grand Cross of the Order of the White Rose of Finland (17 April 2012)

Danish Royal Family 

 Queen Ingrid of Denmark : Grand Cross with Collar of the Order of the White Rose of Finland (20 August 1957)
 Margrethe II of Denmark : Grand Cross with Collar of the Order of the White Rose of Finland
 Frederik, Crown Prince of Denmark : Grand Cross of the Order of the White Rose of Finland
 Crown Princess Mary of Denmark: Grand Cross of the Order of the White Rose of Finland
 Prince Joachim of Denmark : Grand Cross of the Order of the White Rose of Finland
 Princess Marie of Denmark : Grand Cross of the Order of the White Rose of Finland
 Princess Benedikte of Denmark : Grand Cross of the Order of the White Rose of Finland

Dutch Royal Family 

 Princess Beatrix of the Netherlands : Grand Cross with Collar of the Order of the White Rose of Finland (1995)
 Princess Margriet of the Netherlands : Grand Cross of the Order of the White Rose of Finland
 Pieter van Vollenhoven : Grand Cross of the Order of the White Rose of Finland

Belgian Royal Family 

 King Philippe : Grand Cross of the Order of the White Rose of Finland (2004) 
 Queen Mathilde : Grand Cross of the Order of the White Rose of Finland (2004)
 King Albert II : Grand Cross of the Order of the White Rose of Finland
 Queen Paola : Grand Cross of the Order of the White Rose of Finland
Others : None ; Order of Leopols at reception
 Princess Astrid & Prince Lorenz // Prince Laurent & Princess Claire

Luxembourgish Grand-Ducal Family 

 Henri, Grand Duke of Luxembourg : Grand Cross with Collar of the Order of the White Rose of Finland
 Maria Teresa, Grand Duchess of Luxembourg : Grand Cross of the Order of the White Rose of Finland

Spanish Royal Family 
 Juan Carlos I of Spain : Commander Grand Cross with Collar of the Order of the White Rose of Finland (3 June 1975)
 Queen Sofía of Spain : Commander Grand Cross with Collar of the Order of the White Rose of Finland (8 December 1978)

Asian monarchies

Japanese Imperial Family 

 Emperor Akihito : Grand Cross with Collar of the Order of the White Rose (25 September 1986)

References

Works cited 

 
Finland